The Battle of Ivankovac was the first full-scale confrontation between Serbian revolutionaries and the regular forces of the Ottoman Empire during the First Serbian Uprising.

In the Summer of 1805, Hafiz the Ottoman pasha of Niš, gathered an army to crush the Serbian rebels led by Milenko Stojković near the village of Ivankovac. The battle ended with a Serbian victory and the death of the pasha, prompting Ottoman Sultan Selim III to declare jihad (holy war) against the Serbs.

Background
In the 1790s, the Ottoman Sultan Selim III granted the Serbs in the Sanjak of Smederevo (central Serbia) the right to run their own affairs in exchange for their cooperation with the governor of Belgrade, Hadži Mustafa Pasha. Following the Slaughter of the Knezes in February 1804, a revolt led by Karađorđe Petrović erupted against the Ottoman janissary junta (the "Dahije") in Serbia. The Serbs initially received the support of Selim and managed to defeat the corrupt janissaries by the end of the year. In the negotiations that followed the Serbs demanded the restoration of their autonomy while making contact with other Serbs in other parts of the Ottoman Empire. Alarmed by the Serbs demands and actions, Selim appointed the Ottoman governor of Niš, Hafiz Pasha, as the new governor of Belgrade and ordered him to destroy the Serbian insurgents. For the first time a regular Ottoman force was sent to crush the rebels.

Battle
During the Summer the Ottoman force arriving from Niš and led by Hafiz Pasha was ambushed by a much smaller Serbian force commanded by Milenko Stojković at the village of Ivankovac near Ćuprija. On . Serbian leader Karađorđe arrived with guns and reinforcements defeating and driving the Turks back to Niš, where Hafiz Pasha, seriously wounded during the battle, died as a result.

Aftermath
The battle was a major victory for the Serbian rebels. It marked the first time that a regular Ottoman Turkish unit was defeated by Serbian revolutionaries during the First Serbian Uprising. The victory meant that the Serbian forces had taken full control of the Belgrade Pashaluk. Smederevo was captured in November and became the first capital of the Serbian revolutionary government, while Belgrade was taken the following year. Defeat in the battle prompted Selim to declare jihad (holy war) against the Serbian revolutionaries fighting to expel the Turks from Serbia.

Gallery

See also
 List of Serbian Revolutionaries

Notes

References

 
 
 
 
 
 
 
 

Ivankovac
Ivankovac
First Serbian Uprising
Ivankovac
1805 in the Ottoman Empire
1805 in Europe
August 1805 events